Setouchi Kirei Mega Solar Power Plant, located in Setouchi, Okayama, is the largest solar power station in Japan. It has a generating capacity of 235 MW.

History
The plant occupies a large reclaimed site in Kinkai Bay that used to be used for the production of salt.

Construction of the plant began in November 2014. It began commercial operation on 1 October 2018. A completion ceremony was held on 9 November 2018.

Details
The facility comprises about 900,000 solar panels occupying approximately 260 hectares. Electricity produced there is sold to Chugoku Electric Power Company.

See also
 List of power stations in Japan
 Solar power in Japan

References

External links
 

Energy infrastructure completed in 2018
2018 establishments in Japan
Photovoltaic power stations in Japan
Buildings and structures in Okayama Prefecture